Incir Ada (literally "fig island") is a Turkish island and a part of the Foça Islands group. It is a popular destination for recreation by locals and tourists
.

The islands and surrounding bays hold the only seal colonies in Turkey.

See also
 List of islands of Turkey

References 

Islands of Turkey
Islands of İzmir Province
Gulf of İzmir